Kirtley can refer to:

People by family name and surname
 Kirtley (surname)

People by given name
 Kirtley F. Mather

Places
 Kirtley, Texas
 Kirtley, Wyoming